Calliostoma marshalli is a species of sea snail, a marine gastropod mollusk in the family Calliostomatidae.

Description
The size of the shell varies between 11 mm and 14 mm.

Distribution
This marine species occurs in the Gulf of California, Western Mexico, to Panama.

References

External links
 To Biodiversity Heritage Library (2 publications)
 To ITIS
 To World Register of Marine Species
 

marshalli
Gastropods described in 1935